HaPijamot (lit. The Pajamas) is a sitcom on Israeli television about a struggling band determined to make it in the real world. The show ran on Arutz HaYeladim (The Kids' Channel) and Channel 2 (Keshet).

Background
The show follows the misadventures of three friends, Ilan, Kobi and Oded, as they move from Netanya to Tel Aviv to launch their band. Unlike many shows, the characters in the show are aware that they are on television; the show features their day-to-day lives. A major aspect of the show is the white screen, where cast members talk to the viewers. Gary also talks to the viewers when he is alone, often complaining about his wife or just his life in general. There are several interactive episodes, such as an episode which the viewers can fast forward or rewind to decide the outcome of the episode, an episode which the viewers can record ringtones, and an episode with a cheaper form of scratch-and-sniff. The show always ends with the main characters washing the dishes for Gary and summarizing the episode.

Seasons

The 1st season of the show debuted on 1 July 2003 and included 23 episodes. The season ended in a special episode called "My Favorite Episode". Because the show attracted a large number of viewers, The Kids Channel decided to order another two seasons, which were written and filmed together. The 2nd season debuted on 28 March 2004 and included 19 episodes. That season ended with a special episode called "The Gold Pyjamas". The 3rd season of the show premiered on 1 July 2004 and included 20 episodes. The season ended with two special episodes, a documentary episode called "Only The Truth" and a trivia contest about the third season called "This That or That This". After the third season ended, The Kids Channel decided to stop the series, because Alona Tal had left for the US, and the trio filmed a new show on The Music Channel.

A year later, The Kids Channel decided to film a new season in response to high VOD viewing numbers. Alona Tal stayed in the US (but guest starred in five episodes), and the production team picked Yamit Sol to effectively replace her. Yuval Segal, who played Ilan's cousin in three episodes in season two, joined the main cast. This season debuted on 13 August 2006 and included 25 episodes.

In December 2007 The Kids Channel ordered another season. Dana Frider joined the cast for Yuval Segal (who went to study acting in New York), and Yamit Sol was absent in many episodes due to her psychology studies. Eli Keren Asaf was absent in many episodes too (she was drafted to the army). The season was the longest to date, with 36 episodes. It debuted on 1 September 2008.

Several months later, The Kids Channel ordered two more seasons. They were written between January and March 2010. The 6th season began to air on 1 September 2010. These seasons include 25 episodes each. Yuval Segal returned to the main cast. The 7th season aired on 1 September 2011 and included 25 episodes, that season ended on 9 October 2011.

HaPijamot was renewed for two more seasons. The 8th season aired on 19 May 2013. The 9th season aired on 4 January 2015.

Characters

Main
 Ilan Rosenfeld (Ilan Rosenfeld) – Ilan is the keyboard player of the band and writes a majority of the songs. His main interest is girls, and many episodes involve him trying to get a date, but eventually everything goes wrong. His catchphrase is: "What do I need all this for?! Let's just pack up our bags and move back to Netanya."
 Oded Paz (Oded Paz) – Oded is the drummer for the band. He is very dimwitted but he's the luckiest person in the show. He works at the Hamburgary and often irritates Gary. His catchphrase is "Gotta go, Gotta go!".
 Ya'akov "Kobi" Farag (Kobi Farag) – Kobi is the guitarist of the band is always hungry and eats almost anytime he can. He is Gary's nephew and Roni's cousin. He can change clothes remarkably fast, so he has many identities, including Naji Comradin Jackson, an Iraqi who is supposedly the "Chairman of the Association for Apartment Management". He takes advantage of an elderly woman (Ms. Bracha) and always eats at her house.
 Gershon "Gary" Mendelbaum (Yaniv Polishook) – Gary is the owner of the Hamburgary, a burger joint with apparently inedible food. His hot dogs can make someone faint, throw up, or supposedly die (since they are made of fimo). He is Kobi's uncle and Oded's employer. He hates life and is constantly troubled by his wife Shifra and his daughter Roni. Apart from Roni, Gary also has triplets named Poli, Shaike, and Gavri (the names of the three members of HaGashash HaHiver, an Israeli comedy group) who also annoy him. During the last season, Gary discovered "Wikipedia" and tries to change history by editing his and other sitcom characters pages on his magic "Leck-top". Gary says "Why?" every time the situation returns to normal condition.
 Roni Mendelbaum (Eli Keren-Asaf) – Roni is Gary's daughter and thinks badly of her father due to his ignorance. She is referred to as annoying, but she is very talented and usually much smarter than any other character in the show. She always forces Gary to give her money.
 Alona Tal (Alona Tal) – Alona is the background vocalist and percussionist in the band. She is the threesome's neighbor, and they're always fighting over her. Alona Tal is a regular cast member in the first, second, and third seasons and makes guest appearances in the fourth and fifth seasons.
 Yamit Sol (Yamit Sol) – Yamit effectively replaces Alona in the fourth and fifth season, despite officially "[not] replacing Alona". She has her own agenda and is not just the pretty face of the series. She plays percussion and is a background vocalist in the band in the fourth season. In the fifth season, she lives with Dana and learns psychology.
 Nathan Kuperman (Yuval Segal) – Nathan is Ilan's cousin from Beersheba and the band's temporary DJ. He shows up a couple of times in the second season and eventually becomes a main character in the fourth season. He is emotional and cries very loudly when he is either happy or sad.
 Dana Frider (Dana Frider) – Dana Frieder is Shifra's niece and joins the show in the fifth season. However, she doesn't replace Yamit, as they both star in the Fifth season. Yamit has a smaller part in the fifth season. According to the show, 'she went to learn psychology and won't have as much time to run around with the gang' (she actually studied psychology while the fifth season was being filmed). The characters often mention the fact that Dana Frider was in Nolad Lirkod ("Born to Dance", which aired on Israeli television from 2005 to 2008) and did commercials for the Israeli shampoo brand Mui Keph (Hebrew for "very fun"). Dana always clarifies to them that they don't even have the right to fantasize about dating with her.
 Shifra Mendelbaum – Shifra is Gary's wife. Gary is always complaining about her, and claims she is very, very fat and ugly. Whenever she calls Gary, she always complains to him and gives him a lot of chores. She doesn't let him speak, and Gary always starts words without finishing. Shifra is never seen in the show except for one episode, when the young Shifra is seen in some flashbacks ("Lucky Gum"). She is also seen in a spinoff, Mendelbaum Private Detective.

Recurring
 Mr. Avraham Latin (Simon Rosenfeld) –  Mr. Latin is introduced a side character in the fourth season. He is an old man that lives in the same building as the others. He is deaf and whenever someone talks to him, he responds by saying "What?" He is played by Ilan's real-life father.
 Ms. Bracha Kirschenberg (Rivka Gur) – Bracha is an elderly woman who owns the building and hates everyone in it. She calls the threesome "Afrikaner hooligans." She is in love with Naji Jackson (one of Kobi's characters) and always allows him to eat at her house. She is the head of the Mossad, according to the episode "Shem Kod Moustache" ("Secrets").
 Ruby Duenyas (Ruby Duenyas) – Ruby is the show's director. He appears many times in the fourth, fifth, and sixth seasons.
 Badash (Nadav Assouline) – The Devil. He was the producer of Gary and Oded Menashe's band. He first appeared in the first season, when he tried to trick Ilan and convince him to join "In Shtink" (Ilan the first star and Ilan the second star). In the fourth season, he represented Mr. Latin in his prosecution against the Pyjamas ("What?", fourth season, first episode). Appears in four episodes in season five and in three episodes in season six.
 Albert (Aryeh Cherner) – Renovated the Hamburgary and the Trio's home in the fourth, fifth, and sixth seasons.
 Shimon Tzimhoni (Nir Ron) – Tzimhoni is Gary's arch enemy; ever since they competed for a student council election, they started an endless feud. He appears twice in the third season, twice in the fourth season, in three episodes in the fifth season, and twice in the sixth season. In the third season, he and Gary competed for the position of mayor. In the fourth season he tried to buy the Hamburgary, in the fifth he opened a business called Tzimhoburger (in Hebrew "Veggieburger") to compete with Gary's, and in the sixth season he met Gary in the prison.
 Malka Kuperman (Effi Ben Israel) – Ilan's aunt and the owner of the trio's apartment. She didn't live in Israel because she's in a delegation of the Israeli Ministry of Foreign Affairs to Poland. She doesn't know that Oded and Kobi live in the apartment, so every time she's visiting Ilan, Kobi and Oded need to find somewhere to stay overnight. She appears twice in the show: in the two last episodes of the first season, and in the first episode of the sixth season.

Kobi's characters
 Freddie "Nice-to-Meet" – Freddie is the band's manager/impresario. He tends to involve issues unrelated to the original topic of conversation, which causes confusion and agreement among those around him, and sometimes even arouses fear in the rule of his threatening speech. Freddie is one of the only personality splits Kobi has who can take over Kobi on their own. Eddie's brother.
 Naji Comradin Jackson – An elderly man of Iraqi descent with a heavy accent. He introduces himself as the chairman of the Housing Culture Association, which ostensibly came to help his neighbor Bracha Kirschenberg, but actually using this to make her stop complaining about the threesome noise when making music. That becomes very rare since they start doing their rehearsals in Gary's basement. He also uses Ms. Bracha to eat when he is hungry, but Ms. Bracha falls in love with him. Often swears a lot with an Iraqi dialect. Along with freddie, can take over Kobe on his own.
 Marcel Fuerro (Poirot) – A policeman. Based on the fictional character Hercule Poirot. He appears when crimes occur or when investigations are needed. He is Mani's brother, and his rank is "Very Sergeant Major" (Rav samal mitkadem meod), which he tends to mention frequently. He also tends to say "Menuvelet!" (Hebrew for "contemptible", feminine form) a lot. 
 Sabbaba Sali – Rabbi. A parody on the Baba Sali. Often mumbles unclear, confused and meaningless sentences, and at the end highlights the word "sabbaba". Sabbaba Sali tends to greet everyone around him or swear if necessary. His prayers also contain quotes from songs.
 Eddie "Good-to-See" – Freddie's gay brother. He says "Naim li" (Hebrew for "I feel comfortable", but used as "I'm pleased") as a response to someone else's "Pleased to meet you". Dancer, choreographer and producer of small productions. Began to appear in the second season, when it became necessary to invent a softened version of Freddie in order to communicate with Nathan optimally.
 Meir Einstein – A parody of sports and radio broadcaster Meir Einstein. Has a ponytail that covers his eyes, and usually walks around with a comb that also serves as a microphone. Appears as a broadcaster of low importance sports events. Started appearing in the second season. Broadcaster with an obsession to comb his hair.
 Yehoram Zuberbuler – A television broadcaster from the early days of television in Israel, speaks pure but anachronistic Hebrew and his character is presented in black and white. Yehoram appears as a news broadcaster without any news team around him. The announcer of "The Only Channel". He usually shouts his last name. Joined in the sixth season.
 Mani Pire - An excellent and talented chef and the brother of Marcel. Changed his last name from "Poirot" to "Pira". Appeared for the eighth season in which also aired an episode trilogy in which he received a show of his own. Is known for saying "lilcked it" (on the weight of "licked it"). The only personality split in the history of the series that brought Kobi to a fixed period of fame at the cost of a conflict with his friends. Shows up when Kobi is on the TV show "Mister Chef" (Master Chef parody). Becomes a superstar when the group decides to give him an online show to promote the band.
 Jora - An Iraqi Dora. A new character in season 6. Appears only in 3 episodes. She has a monkey friend names Butchak (Boots in the original series) who is played by Nathan,

Episodes

Season 1 (2003)

Season 2 (2004)

Season 3 (2004)

Season 4 (2006)

Season 5 (2008)

Season 6 (2010)

Season 7 (2011)

Season 8 (2013)

Season 9 (2015)

External links
 

 
2003 Israeli television series debuts
2015 Israeli television series endings
Children's comedy television series
Israeli children's television series
Israeli television sitcoms
2000s Israeli television series
2010s Israeli television series